Missoula Montana Airport  is located in Missoula, in Missoula County, Montana. It is owned by the Missoula County Airport Authority.

The National Plan of Integrated Airport Systems for 2011–2015 categorized it as a primary commercial service airport (more than 10,000 enplanements per year). Federal Aviation Administration records say the airport had 288,071 passenger boardings (enplanements) in calendar year 2008, 281,428 in 2009 and 289,875 in 2010.

Several expansion projects have been completed in recent years. A 101-foot control tower was completed in September 2012. An expansion of the old terminal building, with a new security screening area, was completed in 2007. In 2022, construction finished on the new terminal.  

In September 2021, the airport changed its name from Missoula International Airport to Missoula Montana Airport.

History
Missoula's first landing strip was laid out in 1923 south of the university. An additional strip near the Western Montana Fair Grounds on what is now Sentinel High School was sold to the county in 1927 at the request of the Missoula chapter of the National Aeronautic Association and would become Missoula's first true airport. The current airfield is named after that chapter's first president, Harry O. Bell, along with mountain flying pioneer Bob Johnson of Johnson Flying Service (now Minuteman Aviation).

The original Garden City Airport was renamed Hale Field in 1935 and would operate as such until closing forever in 1954.

The airport was gradually replaced by the Missoula County Airport, opened in 1941 with WPA funds, and the cooperation of the US Forest Service, which needed access to an airport. The new airport was renamed Johnson-Bell Field in 1968 and today serves over 750,000 passengers a year.

Facilities
The airport covers 2,700 acres (1,093 ha) at an elevation of 3,206 feet (977 m). It has two asphalt runways: 12/30 is 9,501 by 150 feet (2,896 x 46 m) and 8/26 is 4,612 by 75 feet (1,406 x 23 m).

In the year ending January 1, 2018 the airport had 35,944 aircraft operations, average 98 per day: 63% general aviation, 16% air taxi, 20% airline, and 2% military. 161 aircraft were then based at the airport: 56% single-engine, 20% multi-engine, 18% jet, and 14% helicopter.

The airport recently constructed a new 101-foot tall control tower, replacing one that opened in 1961. The new control tower is one of the tallest control towers in the Pacific Northwest, and is the tallest in Montana. It cost an estimated $6.77 million.

Due to increased patronage, it was determined in 2013 that further expansion of the current terminal was not financially prudent, with a new terminal instead being proposed. Construction started on Phase 1 of the new terminal, the South Concourse, in 2018, and finished in 2022. Demolition of the old terminal was completed in 2023, with construction on Phase 2, the East Concourse Extension starting shortly thereafter. This will include four new gates, an expanded baggage claim area and a new rental car center.

Airlines and destinations

Neptune Aviation, an aerial firefighting company, is based at the airport.

Statistics

Top destinations

See also
List of airports in Montana

References

External links

 Missoula Montana Airport, official website
 
 
 

Airports in Montana
Buildings and structures in Missoula, Montana
Transportation in Missoula County, Montana
1941 establishments in Montana